The 2006 Sky Radio Tennis Masters were held from 10  to 17 December 2006 in the Topsportcentrum Rotterdam in Rotterdam, Netherlands. 

Robin Haase won his first Masters title by beating defending champion Raemon Sluiter in the final. Michaëlla Krajicek won her third consecutive Masters title after beating Elise Tamaëla in a replay of the 2005 final. Krajicek, 17 years old during the tournament had not lost a single match against another Dutch player since she was 11.

Prior to the tournament Thiemo de Bakker and Antal van der Duim were suspended by the Dutch Tennis Association because of bad behaviour after playing some tournaments in Israel in November. Both players were suspended for a month, while Van der Duim also was excluded from the association's youth project.

Men's results

Seeds

Finals

Women's results

Seeds

Finals

External links
Official website
Nu.nl report

Sky Radio Tennis Masters
Sports competitions in Rotterdam
Sky Radio Tennis